Peter Laurence Crisp (born 22 May 1954) is an Australian politician. He was a member of the Victorian Legislative Assembly from 2006 to 2018, representing Mildura. He was formerly a Wentworth Shire Councillor.

Early life
Crisp holds an engineering degree from Ballarat University and was a horticulturist and milk distributor before entering politics. He also served as the Chairman of the Sunraysia Citrus Growers, and was on the board of the Australian Citrus Growers.

Political career
Crisp came to prominence as the chairman of the Save the Food Bowl Alliance, a community group opposed to the Bracks government's plans to build a toxic waste dump at Nowingi, in north-west Victoria.  He resigned his position as chairman after winning National Party pre-selection for the local seat of Mildura, contesting the seat against the Independent Russell Savage.

Savage had held Mildura since 1996, and had polled more than 50% of the primary vote in the 2002 election.  Crisp was able to outpoll Savage 40% to 33% on primary vote and won the seat on preferences, a 25-point swing against the incumbent.

In January 2007 the Labor government abandoned plans to build the Nowingi waste dump after an Environmental Effects Statement recommended against the proposal, as well as acknowledging overwhelming community opposition.

Crisp was the Nationals spokesperson for Public Transport and Major Projects from 2006 until February 2008 when the Nationals and Liberals entered into coalition.

Personal life
Crisp is married with three children.

Controversy
In early 2014, Crisp was charged with several firearms offences—including possession of a prohibited firearm and the possession of guns without a licence—after reporting the theft of three guns from his farm in New South Wales. He attended a court hearing in June 2014, and was found not guilty of three charges, with another three charges dismissed. He pleaded guilty to failing to prevent the loss or theft of a firearm, and was placed on a good behaviour bond.

References

External links
 Parliamentary voting record of Peter Crisp at Victorian Parliament Tracker

1954 births
Living people
National Party of Australia members of the Parliament of Victoria
Members of the Victorian Legislative Assembly
Federation University Australia alumni
People from Mildura
21st-century Australian politicians